Privredni vjesnik is the oldest weekly business and financial newspaper in Croatia.

It was founded in 1953 by Privredna komora Zagreb (Chamber of Commerce Zagreb). Today it is owned by Hrvatska gospodarska komora (Croatian Chamber of Commerce) and about 30,000 copies are distributed to all companies members of the Chamber.

References

External links
Official website 

1953 establishments in Yugoslavia
Weekly newspapers published in Croatia
Croatian-language newspapers
Publications established in 1953
Mass media in Zagreb